Starship Entertainment is a South Korean entertainment company founded in 2008 and became an independent subsidiary of Kakao Entertainment in 2013. It is also called one of the "five major agencies" in the pop music world, with SM Entertainment and YG Entertainment leading the way.

They had been recognized for their contributions to the Hallyu Wave, being home to several prominent K-pop groups and soloists. These include the groups such as Monsta X, Cosmic Girls, Cravity, and Ive and soloists such as K.Will, Yoo Seung-woo, Brother Su, Jeong Se-woon, Wonho, and Kihyun. The label was formerly home to Sistar, Boyfriend, Junggigo, Mad Clown, and Jooyoung. They also manages actors under its subsidiary label King Kong by Starship.

History

2008–2012: Founding and beginnings 
Starship Entertainment was founded in 2008 by the couple Kim Shi-dae and Seo Hyun-joo with Kim Young-suk. Kim Shi-dae previously worked as a road manager for K-pop co-ed group Cool, as well as worked for Big Hit Entertainment between 2005 and 2007, while Seo Hyun-joo worked for JYP Entertainment.

Starship's first artist was ex-Big Hit singer K.Will, who released his first single "Love 119" for the label in 2008. In 2010, Starship debuted their first girl group Sistar, while their first boy group Boyfriend the following year.

2013–present: Expansion and subsidiary labels 
In 2013, Starship announced its first subsidiary label "Starship X", which rapper Mad Clown was signed under.

On December 18, 70% of the label's shares was acquired by its distributor LOEN Entertainment (renamed to Kakao M in 2018 and predecessor of Kakao Entertainment), making it an independent subsidiary of the latter. As of 2022, Kakao Entertainment is still the largest shareholder of the label, holding a 59.73% stake.

Starship signed singer Jeong Se-woon, following his appearance on K-pop Star 3 in July 2014.

In December, Starship partnered with Mnet to produce the survival show No.Mercy, from which they formed their second boy group Monsta X, with the seven winners of the show, debuted in 2015, and promoted as a hip hop boy group.

In April 2015, Starship signed a mutual management contract with the Chinese label Yuehua Entertainment. In December, they jointly debuted a new girl group Cosmic Girls, also known as WJSN, aimed at appealing to both South Korean and Chinese audiences.

In May 2015, Starship acquired 100% of King Kong Entertainment's shares in a strategic partnership alliance. In January 2017, Starship and King Kong registered their merger. The agencies mutually agreed to use the name Starship Entertainment while the division that manages the actors would operate under the label "King Kong by Starship".

In 2017, Starship launched another subsidiary label House of Music, which focused was on recruiting smaller, independent artists, with MoonMoon being the first artist signed under the label. In November 2018, Starship renamed the label "Highline Entertainment".

In 2017, the label's first girl group Sistar disbanded, with members Dasom and Soyou remaining under Starship. 

In 2019, their first boy group Boyfriend disbanded. In December, Starship acquired the performance production company Shownote at 100% stake. It was established in 2005 and accumulated experience in producing live entertainment in various fields such as musicals, concerts, plays, showcases, children's performances, exhibitions, and fan meetings.

In 2020, Starship began expanding Highline, which currently houses artists such as Wonho, Yoo Seung-woo, and DJ Soda. 

On April 14, Starship debuted their new boy group Cravity. 

In August, Starship won the Korea Creative Content Agency Award, for their contributions to the Hallyu Wave.

In June 2021, the label partnered with Eshy Gazit's new label venture Intertwine, in partnership with BMG. Monsta X and Wonho were the first two artists involved in the partnership, securing both global distribution deal and expansion.

On August 22, Starship is reported to form a new girl group featuring former Iz*One members Jang Won-young and An Yu-jin, and expected to debut in the second half of 2021.  

On December 1, Starship debuted their new six-member girl group Ive.

In April 2022, Starship has appointed Lee Hoon-hee as the new CEO. He is an expert in the Korean entertainment industry, who has experienced music and media contents, and has served as CEO of KOEN Media Production Department, CEO of SM C&C, and the Head of Production at KBS. He will lead Starship with the current CEO Lee Jin-sung (CEO of King Kong by Starship).

On August 8, Starship released a statement announcing that all the members of Monsta X, except I.M, renewed their contracts. He decided not to renew his contract with the agency but will still continue to participate in the group's future plans.

On October 24, Yang Jae-woong's older brother Yang Jae-jin, a psychiatrist and broadcaster, has signed an exclusive contract with the agency.

In January 2023, Starship planned to open Dear U bubble service for all its artists, including artists from its division and subsidiaries, starting in February for three years.

On March 3, Starship announced that Cosmic Girls' Chinese members' Xuanyi, Cheng Xiao, and Meiqi had departed from the group following the expiration of their contracts. In the same announcement, it was also announced that Luda and Dawon chose not to renew their contracts, but did not specify whether they will remain in the group.

Philanthropy 
In July 2022, Starship and its artists participated in The Blue Tree Foundation's campaign to declare support for non-violence. It was established to prevent school and cyberbullying, and to heal the victims, is conducting a "national non-violence campaign" in which the citizens can participate to publicize the seriousness of violence and to spread a culture of non-violence.

In February 2023, Starship donated ,000,000 to help in the 2023 Turkey–Syria earthquake through Hope Bridge National Disaster Relief Association.

Partnerships

Active 
  Universal Music Japan
  Sony Music Japan
  Intertwine

Former 
  Being Group
  Kiss Entertainment
  Yuehua Entertainment

Artists 
All artists under Starship Entertainment are collectively known as Starship Planet.

Musicians

Soloists
 K.Will
 Jeong Se-woon
 Kihyun

Groups
 Monsta X
 Cosmic Girls 
 Cravity
 Ive

Project groups
 YTeen (with KT)
OG School Project (with Cube Entertainment)
YDPP (with Brand New Music)
WJMK (with Fantagio Music)

Starship X
 Brother Su
 Kiggen

Highline
 Wonho
 Yoo Seung-woo
 Leon	
 DJ Vanto
 dress	
 ROVXE	
 Seungguk

Actors/actresses

Influencer 
 Yang Jae-jin

Former artists 

Sistar (2010–2017)
Bora (2010–2017)
Hyolyn (2010–2017)
Dasom (2010–2021)
Soyou (2010–2021)
Boyfriend (2011–2019)
Mind U (2017–2022)
Duetto (2017–2022)
I.M (2015–2022)
Luda (2016–2023)
Dawon (2016–2023)
Xuanyi (2016–2023)
Cheng Xiao (2016–2023)
Meiqi (2016–2023)

Starship X 
 Junggigo (2013–2018)
 Mad Clown (2013–2018)
 Jooyoung (2014–2021)
 #Gun (2015–2022)

Highline 
 MoonMoon (2017–2018; contract terminated due to occlusion of a formal criminal record)
 DJ Soda (2018–2021)
 Lil Reta (2020–2022)
 Jang Seok-hoon (2019–2022)		
 PLUMA (2019–2022)
 M1NU (2020–2022)

Discography

Awards

Notes

References

External links 
 

 
Companies based in Seoul
Entertainment companies established in 2008
Contemporary R&B record labels
Hip hop record labels
Labels distributed by Kakao M
Music publishing companies
K-pop record labels
Publishing companies established in 2008
South Korean record labels
Talent agencies of South Korea
South Korean companies established in 2008